Huasna (Chumash: Awasna) is an unincorporated community in southeastern San Luis Obispo County, California, United States.

Huasna is located on the western slope of the southern Santa Lucia Range.  Huasna is due east and far inland of Arroyo Grande.

The Huasna River runs through the community.

References

Unincorporated communities in San Luis Obispo County, California
Santa Lucia Range
Unincorporated communities in California